Abram is an unincorporated community and census-designated place in Hidalgo County, Texas, United States. Its population was 2,067 as of the 2010 census. Prior to 2010, the community was part of the Abram-Perezville census-designated place with nearby Perezville. The community was named after Texas Ranger Abram Dillard, who was a resident of the area.

Geography

Education
Abram is served by the La Joya Independent School District. Schools serving the CDP include Guillermo Flores Elementary School and JFK Elementary School, C. Chavez Middle School, and La Joya High School.

References

Unincorporated communities in Hidalgo County, Texas
Unincorporated communities in Texas
Census-designated places in Hidalgo County, Texas
Census-designated places in Texas